Julia Dillon may refer to:

Julia Lester Dillon (1871–1959), American teacher
Julia McEntee Dillon (1834–1918), American painter

See also
Julie Dillon (born 1982), American illustrator